The World Series Formula V8 3.5, formerly the World Series by Nissan from 1998 to 2004, the Formula Renault 3.5 Series from 2005 to 2015 and the Formula V8 3.5 in 2016 and 2017, was a motor racing series promoted by RPM Racing (1998–2004) and Renault Sport (2005–2015).

History

The series came out of the Spanish Formula Renault Championship, which ran from 1991 to 1997. The World Series was founded as Open Fortuna by Nissan in 1998, and was mostly based in Spain, but visited other countries throughout its history, including France, Italy, Portugal and Brazil. The organization was handled by RPM Comunicacion, founded by Jaime Alguersuari Tortajada. The series changed name a number of times, usually adopting the name of its main sponsor, but was also known by other common names such as the unofficial "Formula Nissan".

In its early years, the series used chassis built by Coloni, with a 2.0 L Nissan SR20 engine. The series slotted in between Formula Three and Formula 3000. In 2002, it adopted a new format, with chassis supplied by Dallara and the engine upgraded to the VQ30. The series also became more international, with more than half of the race calendar held outside Spain.

Renault started the Formula Renault V6 Eurocup in 2003, as a support series in Eurosport's Super Racing Weekends (European Touring Car Championship and FIA GT Championship). The series ran with Tatuus chassis and a Nissan 3.5 L V6 engine.

In 2005, Renault left the Super Racing Weekend and started the World Series by Renault and the Formula Renault 3.5 Series, merging both the World Series by Nissan (whose engine contract had finished) and Renault V6 Eurocup. The Dallara chassis was retained, while the Renault V6 was improved to 425 PS. Formula Renault 2.0 Eurocup and the Eurocup Mégane Trophy also joined the series in 2005 to support the main FR3.5 series.

At the end of July 2015, Renault Sport announced it would be withdrawing its backing to the Formula Renault 3.5 from 2016 onwards, handing the control of the series to co-organiser RPM. However, Renault Sport also said it would continue the World Series by Renault with the Renault Sport Trophy and the Formula Renault 2.0 Eurocup. As a result of this, RPM decided to change the series' name to Formula V8 3.5. In December 2016, the series' name was changed again to World Series Formula V8 3.5, giving extra recognition to the championship.
On 17 November 2017 was announced that due to lack of entries the series would not take place in 2018 with a possibility of relaunch in the near future.

Technical
From 2008 to 2011, the chassis for the Formula Renault 3.5 Series is the Dallara T08 and the engine a 3.5 litre V6 Nissan VQ35 unit producing 480 bhp with a rev limit of 8500 rpm. The gearbox is a 6 speed semi-automatic supplied by Ricardo with steering wheel paddle shift. Total weight of the car is 600 kg (dry).

Starting from 2012 season, the Formula Renault 3.5 Series adopted a new chassis, the Dallara T12, powered by a 3.4 litre V8 engine producing 530 BHP at 9250 rpm developed by Zytek. The cars have 50 more horsepower than previous season and lost 15 kg (33 pounds) of weight. In addition, a Drag Reduction System is used, which operates in a similar way to the one in use in Formula One.

Specifications
Engine displacement:  DOHC V8
Gearbox: 6-speed paddle shift gearbox (must have reverse)
Weight: 
Power output: 
Torque output: 
Fuel: Elf LMS 102 RON unleaded
Fuel capacity: 
Fuel delivery: Fuel injection
Aspiration: Normally-aspirated
Length: 
Width: 
Wheelbase: 
Steering: Power-assisted rack and pinion

Champions

World Series by Nissan

NOTE – 1998–2001, mainly Spanish-based series (also known as Formula Nissan) with 2.0L engine.
NOTE – 2002–2004, international series with V6 engine.

World Series Light

Formula Renault 3.5 Series

World Series Formula V8 3.5

Notable drivers

 Formula One drivers in the future and/or past
 Marc Gené (1998: Champion, 2003: 12th), competed in Formula One for Minardi and Williams. 
 Fernando Alonso (1999: Champion), competed in Formula One for Minardi, McLaren, Ferrari and was twice world champion with Renault. Competing for Alpine in 2021.
 Giorgio Pantano (1999: 21st), competed in Formula One for Jordan.
 Franck Montagny (2001: Champion, 2002: 2nd, 2003: Champion), competed in Formula One for Super Aguri, and with Andretti in Formula E.
 Ricardo Zonta (2002: Champion) – 1997 FIA GT Champion, competed in Formula One for BAR, Jordan and Toyota.
 Justin Wilson (2002: 4th), competed in Formula One for Minardi and Jaguar, and in IndyCar for Dale Coyne and Andretti Autosport amongst others.
 Narain Karthikeyan (2002: 9th, 2003: 4th, 2004: 6th), competed in Formula One for Jordan and HRT in 2011.
 Heikki Kovalainen (2003: 2nd, 2004: Champion), competed in Formula One for Renault, McLaren, Caterham and Team Lotus.
 Enrique Bernoldi (2003: 6th, 2004: 3rd), competed in Formula One for Arrows.
 Stéphane Sarrazin (2003: 7th), competed in Formula One for Minardi, currently with Venturi Grand Prix in the FIA Formula E Championship.
 Tiago Monteiro (2004: 2nd), competed in Formula One for Jordan and Midland/Spyker. Currently competing in World Touring Car Cup (WTCR) with ALL-INKL.DE Munnich Motorsport, using a Honda Civic Type R TCR (FK8).
 Robert Kubica (2005: Champion), has competed in Formula One for BMW Sauber, Renault and Williams F1, also competed in the World Rally Championship. Currently competing in Formula One as a reserve driver for Alfa Romeo Racing.
 Markus Winkelhock (2005: 3rd), one-off Formula One drive for Spyker (Nurburgring 2007).
 Kamui Kobayashi (2005 Eurocup: 1st) has competed in Formula One for Toyota, Sauber and Caterham.
 Karun Chandhok (2005: 29th) has competed in Formula One for HRT and Team Lotus.
 Pastor Maldonado (2005: 25th; 2006: 3rd) has competed in Formula One for Williams and Lotus.
 Sebastian Vettel (2006: 15th, 2007: 5th − 1st after seven races, when withdrew to compete in F1) has competed in Formula One for BMW Sauber, Scuderia Toro Rosso, was four time Formula One world champion with Red Bull, and Ferrari. Competing for Aston Martin in 2021.
 Giedo van der Garde (2007: 6th, 2008: Champion) GP2 Series has competed in Formula One.
 Jaime Alguersuari (2009: 6th) has competed in Formula One for Scuderia Toro Rosso.
 Daniel Ricciardo (2010: 2nd; 2011: 5th) competed in Formula One for HRT, Scuderia Toro Rosso, Red Bull, and Renault. Competing for Mclaren in 2021.
 Jean-Éric Vergne (2010: 8th; 2011: 2nd) competed in Formula One for Scuderia Toro Rosso, currently competing for Techeetah in Formula E.
 Robin Frijns (2012: Champion) Caterham F1 third driver for 2014.
 Jules Bianchi (2012: 2nd) last competed in Formula One with Marussia. On 5 October 2014, during the Japanese Grand Prix, Bianchi lost control of his Marussia in very wet conditions and collided with a recovery vehicle, suffering a brain injury. He underwent emergency surgery and was placed into an induced coma, and remained comatose until his death on 17 July 2015.
 Will Stevens (2012: 12th; 2013: 4th; 2014: 6th) has competed in Formula one for Caterham and Manor Marussia.
 Sergey Sirotkin (2013: 8th) competed in Formula One for Williams.
 Kevin Magnussen (2013: Champion) competed in Formula One with McLaren in 2014–2015, Renault 2016, and Haas 2017–2020, 2022.
 Stoffel Vandoorne (2013: 2nd) competed in Formula One for McLaren. Reserve driver for Mercedes and currently competing in Formula E with Mercedes.
 Roberto Merhi (2014: 3rd; 2015: 14th) has competed in Formula One for Manor Marussia.
 Carlos Sainz Jr. (2014: Champion) competed in Formula One for Scuderia Toro Rosso, Renault (on loan from Scuderia Toro Rosso) and Mclaren. Competing for Ferrari in 2021.
 Alfonso Celis Jr. (2014: 27th; 2015: 16th; 2016: 11th; 2017: 3rd) Force India development driver from 2016 until 2017.
 Esteban Ocon (2014: 23rd) competed in Formula One for Force India and Renault F1. Competing for Alpine in 2021.
 Pierre Gasly (2014: 2nd) competed in Formula One for Scuderia Toro Rosso. Currently competing in Formula One for AlphaTauri.
 Pietro Fittipaldi (2017 Champion) competed in Formula One for Haas F1 Team. Reserve/development driver for Haas F1 Team.

 Champions in other categories
 Andy Priaulx (2001: 18th) – 2004 European Touring Car Championship (ETCC) Champion, 2005, 2006 and 2007 World Touring Car Championship (WTCC) World Champion
 Matteo Bobbi (2001: 11th, 2002: 6th) – 2003 FIA GT Champion
 Alex Lloyd (2005: 40th) – 2007 Indy Lights champion.
 Simon Pagenaud (2005: 16th) – 2006 Atlantics Champion    2016 IndyCar champion.
 Davide Valsecchi (2006: 10th, 2007: 16th) – 2012 GP2 Series Champion.
 Will Power (2005: 7th) 2014 IndyCar champion.
 Miloš Pavlović (2005: 17th; 2006: 11th; 2007: 3rd) – 2014 Lamborghini Super Trofeo

 Other notable drivers
 Álvaro Parente (2006: 5th; 2007: 1st) GP2 Series winner, has driven and stood on the podium for Super Nova Racing, Ocean Racing Technology, Scuderia Coloni, and Racing Engineering
 Esteban Guerrieri (2008: 8th, 2009: 19th, 2010: 3rd) 2011 and 2012 Indy Lights runner-up for Sam Schmidt Motorsports. 2019 WTCR runner-up.

Television broadcast
World Series by Renault races were broadcast live as part of a package of the combined open-wheel and touring car races on the pan-European Eurosport subscription channel or its sister stations Eurosport2 and British Eurosport. Eurosport is also on-sold to several non-European networks, extending World Series by Renault's international reach as far as South East Asia and Oceania. The races are also carried live by Estonia channel Kanal 12 and Spain channel Aragon TV. Abbreviated highlights packages were carried by several other television networks and stations, including the British channels Sky Sports and MotorsTV, the Dutch RTL 7 channel, ESPN Star Sports in Asia, Speed in South America and Esporte Interativo in Brazil.

See also
 Formula Renault V6 Eurocup
 World Series by Renault

References

External links
 
 Grupo Alesport (RPM Racing) Official website 
 World Series by Renault Official website

 
 
Recurring sporting events established in 1998
Recurring sporting events disestablished in 2017